Joseph Armon-Jones (born February 1993) is a British musician, keyboardist, composer, producer and bandleader. 

His debut album, Starting Today, was released in May 2018 and his second album, Turn To Clear View, was released in September 2019. Time magazine listed the 2019 release as one of the top 10 albums of the year. Aside from his solo work, he is a member of Ezra Collective and Nubya Garcia's band.

Background 

Joe Armon-Jones was born in Oxfordshire to musician parents, his mother being a singer and his father a jazz pianist.

He was educated at Eton College.

He attended the workshops of Tomorrow's Warriors under the direction of bass player Gary Crosby, where he met and became a founding member of the group Ezra Collective. Armon-Jones graduated from Trinity Laban with a BMus in 2016. Among his graduating class were Nubya Garcia and Moses Boyd.

Discography

As leader
 Idiom (Joe Armon-Jones & Maxwell Owin, YAM Records, 2017)
 Starting Today (Brownswood, 2018)
 Turn to Clear View (Brownswood, 2019)

As sideman
 Ezra Collective, Chapter 7 (2016)
 Ezra Collective, Juan Pablo: The Philosopher (Enter the Jungle, 2017)
 Nubya Garcia, Nubya's 5ive (Jazz Re:freshed, 2017)
 Moses Boyd, Displaced Diaspora (Exodus, 2018)
 We Out Here (Brownswood, 2018)
 Ezra Collective, You Can't Steal My Joy, (Enter the Jungle, 2019)
 SEED Ensemble, Driftglass (Jazz Re:freshed, 2019)
 Binker Golding, Abstractions of Reality (2019)
 Tony Allen & Hugh Masekela, Rejoice (World Circuit/BMG, 2020)
 Moses Boyd, Dark Matter (Exodus, 2020)
 Nubya Garcia, Source (Concord Jazz, 2020)
 Keleketla!, Keleketla! (Ahead of Our Time, 2020)
 Gilles Peterson, MV4 (Brownswood, 2020)

Awards 
 2019 Jazz FM Awards – UK Jazz Act of the Year – Nominee
 2019 Worldwide Awards – Best Album – Nominee
 2019 Worldwide Awards – Session of the Year – Winner
 2020 Urban Music Awards – Best Jazz Act – Nominee
 2020 Jazz FM Awards – UK Jazz Act of the Year – Nominee
 2020 MOBO Awards – Best Jazz Act – Nominee

References

External links
Official website
AllMusic biography

British jazz musicians
21st-century jazz composers
British keyboardists
British bandleaders
1993 births
Living people